Miloš Zlatković (born 1 January 1997) is a Serbian football center back, playing for Tampines Rovers.

Career

OFK Beograd
He made his debut for the first team in 16 May 2015, coming on as a substitute during the break against Crvena Zvezda.

Tampines Rovers
On 10 January 2023, it was reported that he had joined Tampines Rovers which is playing in the Singapore Premier League.

Career statistics

Club

International Statistics

U19 International caps

U18 International caps

U17 International caps

References

External links
 
 

1997 births
Living people
Sportspeople from Niš
Association football defenders
Serbian footballers
OFK Beograd players
FK Zemun players
FK Dinamo Vranje players
Serbian First League players
Serbian SuperLiga players
Premier League of Bosnia and Herzegovina players
Serbia youth international footballers